Out of My Hand is a 2015 American drama film directed by Takeshi Fukunaga. It was screened in the Panorama section of the 65th Berlin International Film Festival.

Cast
 Bishop Blay as Cisco
 Duke Murphy Dennis
 Zenobia Kpoto

References

External links
 

2015 films
2015 drama films
American drama films
Films shot in Liberia
2010s English-language films
2010s American films